Matikuri is an island in the Solomon Islands. It is located in the Western Province. Matikuri Island is off greater Vangunu Island, an extinct volcano.

See also

References

Islands of the Solomon Islands
Western Province (Solomon Islands)